John Stiles was born and raised in the Annapolis Valley in Nova Scotia, Canada. He is the author of the poetry collections Scouts are Cancelled and Creamsicle Stick Shivs, as well as the novels The Insolent Boy  and Taking the Stairs. Featured on CBC's 'Q', Much Music, and TVO's 'Imprint', Stiles has also written for The Globe and Mail  and The Literary Review of Canada. A documentary about Stiles and his poems in Scouts are Cancelled was festival pick in the Hot Docs festival in Toronto 2007 and won best Canadian documentary award in The Atlantic Film Festival  in September 2007. Stiles lives with his wife in London, England.

Poetry
Creamsicle Stick Shivs, (Insomniac Press, 2006)
Scouts are Cancelled, (Insomniac Press, 2002)

Novels
Taking the Stairs, (Nightwood Editions, 2008)
The Insolent Boy, (Insomniac Press, 2001)

Anthologies
Poet's Quest for God: 21st Century poems of faith doubt and wonder (Eyewear, UK, 2016)
Outside Voices 2008 Anthology of Younger Poets (Outside Voices, 2008)
Babylon Burning: 9/11 Five Years On (nthposition UK, 2006)New American Writing (Oink! Press, USA, 2005)Doom, Desire and Vice, (Wingate Press, CANADA, 2005)The I.V. Lounge Reader'', (Insomniac Press, CANADA, 2001)

Film

Scouts are Cancelled

the smalls...er whatever

References

"Eye Weekly: The Smalls...er whatever"

External links 
Insomniac Press
Nightwood Editions

20th-century Canadian poets
Canadian male poets
Canadian male novelists
Living people
20th-century Canadian male writers
Year of birth missing (living people)